Ali Motahhari (born 26 January 1958) is an Iranian politician who is known as a conservative and is also named as a sort of conservative reformist, who represented Tehran, Rey, Shemiranat and Eslamshahr electoral district in the Parliament of Iran since 2008 and was Second Deputy of the Parliament of Iran from 2016 until 2019.

Motahhari is described as an orthodox politician with liberal conservative and moderate conservative views. He is the leader of the People's Voice Coalition.

Motahhari heads Sadra Publications and teaches at University of Tehran, where he gained a PhD in philosophy.

Biography
Ali Motahhari was born in Tehran. His father is noted Islamic scholar Morteza Motahhari.
 
Motahari is a brother-in-law of the current Speaker of the Parliament Ali Larijani, and a harsh critic of Mahmoud Ahmadinejad. He criticized Ahmadinejad for his "self-centered" policies saying: "It is unprecedented and inappropriate that a president simply says I do not accept this law and will not execute it. This is a sign of despotism." Motahhari tried to summon Ahmadinejad to parliament to face questioning and possible impeachment. Though a conservative, he has been something of a maverick.

On 13 March 2015, Motahari was injured in an attack by "motorcycle thugs" before giving a speech at Shiraz University.

In 2020, he suggested that the Islamic Republic was to partially blame for the Israel–United Arab Emirates normalization agreement, saying "We have scared the Arabs and pushed them towards Israel. An example of this is storming the Saudi embassy and setting it ablaze. The policy of making Iran the enemy has been fruitful. This needs to be remedied." This was a highly unusual response contrasted to that of other Iranian politicians.

On April 6, 2021, Motahari sparked controversy after he said in a podcast that European men were "not aroused and women are resorting to African men."

Electoral history

Public image
According to a poll conducted in March 2016 by Information and Public Opinion Solutions LLC (iPOS) among Iranian citizens, Motahhari has 36% approval and 15% disapproval ratings and thus a +21% net popularity; while 40% of responders don't recognize the name.

References

External links

 Interview by PBS

1958 births
Living people
Members of the 10th Islamic Consultative Assembly
Iranian publishers (people)
Members of the 9th Islamic Consultative Assembly
Members of the 8th Islamic Consultative Assembly
Voice of Nation politicians
Followers of Wilayat fraction members
Second Deputies of Islamic Consultative Assembly
Politicians from Tehran
University of Tehran alumni
Academic staff of the University of Tehran
Iranian politicians who have crossed the floor
Morteza Motahhari